Elda Panopoulou is a Greek comedian, best known for her role as "Haroula Peponaki" in the Greek sitcom To Retire (The Penthouse).

Early life 
Panopoulou was born in Athens in the early 1960s. Her two parents were teachers; they owned their own school.

Career 
Her first appearance was in a Greek romance series, titled "Alithines Istories", alongside Giorgos Kimoulis and Martha Karagianni in 1984. The ratings were low and after 6 episodes it was cancelled. In 1991 she did her break through as the nervous but caring operator in the Greek sitcom To Retire. After a couple more comedy sitcoms, Panopoulou started to present her own show in the public television.

Panopoulou starred in two more series; "An Thimitheis to Oneiro Mou" and "Jenny kai Evanthia". Both of them were failures and since 2004 she has not acted on television. She dedicated herself to comedy theatre and a few years ago, in 2005 she created her very own theatre school, Melissa Theatre School.
In 2007, she did a guest appearance on the popular Greek sitcom To Kokkino Domatio, aired on Mega.

External links 
 
 

1960s births
Living people
Greek women comedians
Actresses from Athens